Lago di Levico is a lake in Trentino, Italy. At an elevation of 440 m, its surface area is 1.164 km².

Lakes of Trentino-Alto Adige/Südtirol